Jacquelyn Joy Mercer (January 7, 1931 – February 2, 1982) was Miss America in 1949.

Biography

Mercer was born in Thatcher, Arizona. A granddaughter of the pioneer Linville family who first settled in Arizona in the late 1880s, she won the title of Miss America in 1949. She is mentioned (usually by title, once by name) several times in the 1997 Philip Roth novel, American Pastoral.

She married and divorced her high school sweetheart, Douglas Cook, during her reign as Miss America. After this, a rule was enacted which requires Miss America contestants to sign a pledge vowing they have never been married or pregnant. 

While a student at the Arizona State College at Tempe, Mercer acted in a professional stage production of Hay Fever at the Sombrero Playhouse in Phoenix during February 1953, alongside Miriam Hopkins, Wilton Graff, and George Nader.

After divorcing Cook in 1950 Mercer married a casual acquaintance, William Oldenburger, in Los Angeles in August 1952, but divorced 11 days later. In May 1953 she married college and later Green Bay Packer football player Richard Curran in Litchfield Park, Arizona and had two children, Richard Jr. and Sharron Curran. The Currans resided in Phoenix, where Dick Curran founded an advertising agency and Jacque later taught school; they divorced in 1974. In January 1978 she married William Marvin Gillespie in Los Angeles. On February 2, 1982, Mercer died of leukemia Los Angeles, California

References

External links
 Jacque Mercer profile from the Miss America Organization
 Arizona Archives Online

1931 births
1982 deaths
People from Thatcher, Arizona
Miss America 1940s delegates
Miss America winners
Miss America Preliminary Talent winners
Miss America Preliminary Swimsuit winners
People from Litchfield Park, Arizona
20th-century American people